The 12th Vuelta a España (Tour of Spain), a long-distance bicycle stage race and one of the three grand tours, was held from 26 April to 12 May 1957. Vicente Iturat won the points classification and Federico Bahamontes won the mountains classification.

Teams and riders

Route

Results

References

 
1957
1957 in Spanish sport
1957 in road cycling